Francisco Anderson de Jesus dos Santos (born 21 May 1999), known as Anderson Ceará, is a Brazilian footballer who plays as an attacking midfielder for Santa Cruz, on loan from Santos.

Club career

Santos
Born in Tianguá, Ceará, Anderson Ceará joined Santos' youth setup in October 2012, aged 13. On 27 July 2018, he signed his first professional contract, agreeing to a deal until June 2021.

Anderson Ceará made his senior debut with the B-team on 8 August 2018, coming on as a second-half substitute in a 5–2 away win against Bragantino, for the year's Copa Paulista. He made his first team – and Série A – debut on 21 November, replacing goalscorer Rodrygo in a 1–1 home draw against Botafogo.

On 29 November 2018, Anderson Ceará suffered a knee injury, being sidelined for eight months. He returned to action in May 2019, but spent the remainder of that year with the youth setup.

In June 2020, Anderson Ceará was promoted to the main squad by manager Jesualdo Ferreira, and renewed until 2023 on 18 July. On 19 November, after receiving little playing time, he moved to CRB on loan until the end of the season.

On 13 December 2021, after again featuring very rarely, Anderson Ceará was loaned to Maringá until the end of the 2022 Campeonato Paranaense. The following 8 June, he was presented at Série D side Santa Cruz, also on loan.

On 22 October 2022, Anderson Ceará's loan with Santa was extended until the end of the 2023 Campeonato Pernambucano.

Career statistics

References

External links
Santos FC profile 

1999 births
Living people
Sportspeople from Ceará
Brazilian footballers
Association football midfielders
Campeonato Brasileiro Série A players
Campeonato Brasileiro Série B players
Campeonato Brasileiro Série D players
Campeonato Paranaense players
Santos FC players
Clube de Regatas Brasil players
Maringá Futebol Clube players
Santa Cruz Futebol Clube players